Braden is a town in Fayette County, Tennessee. The population was 282 at the 2010 census.  The town is named after Joseph P. Braden.

History
Braden was founded in 1850 as a depot on the Louisville and Nashville Railroad.

Geography
Braden is located at  (35.374867, -89.574942).

Demographics

As of the census of 2000, there were 271 people, 104 households, and 79 families residing in the town. The racial makeup of the town was 91.14% White, 7.01% Black or African American, 0.37% Native American, and 1.48% from two or more races. Hispanic or Latino of any race were 0.37% of the population.

There were 104 households, out of which 31.7% had children under the age of 18 living with them, 66.3% were married couples living together, 7.7% had a female householder with no husband present, and 24.0% were non-families. 16.3% of all households were made up of individuals, and 4.8% had someone living alone who was 65 years of age or older. The average household size was 2.61 and the average family size was 2.97.

In the town, the population was spread out, with 22.5% under the age of 18, 7.7% from 18 to 24, 33.9% from 25 to 44, 28.0% from 45 to 64, and 7.7% who were 65 years of age or older. The median age was 37 years. For every 100 females, there were 103.8 males. For every 100 females age 18 and over, there were 103.9 males.

The median income for a household in the town was $48,333, and the median income for a family was $51,750. Males had a median income of $35,625 versus $30,000 for females. The per capita income for the town was $19,610. About 4.9% of families and 7.0% of the population were below the poverty line, including 10.3% of those under the age of eighteen and none of those 65 or over.

References

Towns in Fayette County, Tennessee
Towns in Tennessee
Memphis metropolitan area
Populated places established in 1789
1789 establishments in North Carolina